The third season of the American television medical drama Grey's Anatomy, commenced airing on the American Broadcasting Company (ABC) on September 21, 2006, and concluded on May 17, 2007. The season was produced by Touchstone Television, in association with Shondaland Production Company and The Mark Gordon Company, the showrunner being Shonda Rhimes. Actors Ellen Pompeo, Sandra Oh, Katherine Heigl, Justin Chambers and T. R. Knight reprised their roles as surgical interns Meredith Grey, Cristina Yang, Izzie Stevens, Alex Karev and George O'Malley, respectively, continuing their expansive storylines as focal points throughout the season. Previous main cast members Chandra Wilson, James Pickens, Jr., Kate Walsh, Isaiah Washington, and Patrick Dempsey also returned, while previous guest-stars Sara Ramirez and Eric Dane were promoted to series-regulars, following the extension of their contracts.

The season followed the continuation of the surgical residency of 5 young interns, as they experience the demands of the competitive field of medicine, which becomes defining in their personal evolution. Although set in fictional Seattle Grace Hospital, located in Seattle, Washington, filming primarily occurred in Los Angeles, California. Whereas the first season mainly focused on the impact the surgical field has on the main characters, and the second season provided a detailed perspective on the physicians' private lives, the third season deals with the tough challenges brought by the last phase of the surgeons' internship, combining the professional motif emphasized in the first season, with the complex personal background used in the second. Through the season, several new storylines are introduced, including the arrival of Dane's character, Dr. Mark Sloan, conceived and introduced as an antagonizing presence.

In a departure from the previous season, the third season aired in a new competitive time-slot of 9:00 pm on Thursdays, competing against the heavily-promoted and highly-rated dramatic television series CSI: Crime Scene Investigation, which simultaneously aired on the CBS Network. Season 3 of Grey's Anatomy contained 25 episodes, in addition to 2 clip shows that were produced to recap the previous events of the show, before the introduction of major new arcs. "Complications of the Heart" aired on the same night as the season premiere, recapping the last episodes of the second season with insights into future episodes in the third, while "Every Moment Counts" aired before the twentieth episode. The season also aired a 2-part episode arc, which primarily served as a backdoor pilot for a proposed spin-off, Private Practice, focusing on the departure of Walsh's character, Dr. Addison Montgomery.

The series ended its third season with an average of 19.22 million viewers per episode and a 6.8/35 Nielsen rating/share in the 18–49 demographic, ranking #8 in the television season, outperformed by CSI. Television critics expressed a mainly negative outlook on the development of the series throughout the season, with the reviews ranging from mixed-to-negative, as exaggeration and lack of realism have been highlighted as the main issues in the declining quality of the storylines. Despite the negative critical response, the performance of the cast members and the production technique of the crew received outstanding recognition through numerous awards and nominations. Earning major category nominations at the 59th Primetime Emmy Awards and the 65th Golden Globe Awards, the season achieved the series' highest number of recipients, with Heigl being the most-awarded cast member. The series was ranked #6 in USA Today "best of television" list, following the conclusion of the season.

Episodes 

Each episode of this season is named after a song.

Cast and characters

Main 
 Ellen Pompeo as Dr. Meredith Grey
 Sandra Oh as Dr. Cristina Yang
 Katherine Heigl as Dr. Izzie Stevens
 Justin Chambers as Dr. Alex Karev
 T. R. Knight as Dr. George O'Malley
 Chandra Wilson as Dr. Miranda Bailey
 James Pickens Jr. as Dr. Richard Webber
 Kate Walsh as Dr. Addison Montgomery
 Sara Ramirez as Dr. Callie Torres
 Eric Dane as Dr. Mark Sloan
 Isaiah Washington as Dr. Preston Burke
 Patrick Dempsey as Dr. Derek Shepherd

Recurring 
 Chyler Leigh as Dr. Lexie Grey
 Brooke Smith as Dr. Erica Hahn
 Kate Burton as Ellis Grey
 Chris O'Donnell as Finn Dandridge
 Steven W. Bailey as Joe, the Bartender 
 Kyle Chandler as Dylan Young 
 Jeffrey Dean Morgan as Denny Duquette

Notable guests 
 Elizabeth Reaser as Rebecca "Ava" Pope
 Loretta Devine as Adele Webber
 Sarah Utterback as Olivia Harper
 Héctor Elizondo as Carlos Torres
 Kali Rocha as Sydney Heron
 Mitch Pileggi as Lawrence Jennings 
 Roger Rees as Colin Marlowe
 Jeff Perry as Thatcher Grey
 Mare Winningham as Susan Grey
 Debra Monk as Louise O'Malley
 George Dzundza as Harold O'Malley
 Tim Griffin as Ronny O'Malley
 Greg Pitts as Jerry O'Malley
 Robin Pearson Rose as Patricia Murphy
 Elisabeth Moss as Nina Rogerson
 Embeth Davidtz as Nancy Shepherd
 Monica Keena as Bonnie Crasnoff
 Nicole Cummins as Paramedic Nicole 
 Anna Maria Horsford as Elizabeth Fallon
 Abigail Breslin as Megan Clover
 Mae Whitman as Heather Douglas
 Tsai Chin as Helen Yang
 Diahann Carroll as Jane Burke
 Amy Brenneman as Violet Turner
 Paul Adelstein as Cooper Freedman
 Tim Daly as Pete Wilder
 Chris Lowell as Dell Parker
 Taye Diggs as Sam Bennett
 Merrin Dungey as Naomi Bennett

Production

Crew 
This season is the last to be produced by ABC Studios under title of Touchstone Television, as the company's decision to change its name occurred after the conclusion of the season. Shonda Rhimes returned as the series' showrunner and executive producer. She also continued her position from the first 2 seasons as one of the most prominent members of the writing staff. Betsy Beers, Mark Gordon and Rob Corn also returned as executive producers, along with Mark Wilding, Peter Horton and Krista Vernoff, who have been in this position since the inception of the series. Allan Heinberg, however, joins the production team at the beginning of the third season as a co-executive producer, before his promotion to an executive. Kent Hodder, Nancy Bordson and Steve Mulholland served as executive producers for 4 episodes during the season. Horton left the series at the conclusion of the season, whereas James D. Parriott, who previously served a writer and executive producer for the first 2 seasons, did not continue his work on the show during this season. Joan Rater and Tony Phelan continued to serve as co-executive producers, with Rater being a supervising producer as well. Stacy McKee, who previously served as a producer and writer for the series, was promoted to co-executive producer. 

After having written 3 episodes for the first season and 5 for the second, Rhimes returned as a writer for 6 episodes, out of which one was written along with Marti Noxon. Krista Vernoff, Tony Phelan, Stacy McKee and Mark Wilding returned to the series as members of the writing staff, with Vernoff and Phelan writing 3 episodes and McKee and Wilding producing the script of 2 episodes. Gabrielle Stanton and Harry Werksman, Jr. worked together for the writing of 1 episode, after 3 episodes they have written for the series in the past. The season includes the first episode to be written by Debora Cahn, who would become one of the series' main writers, as well as a consulting and supervisor producer. Other writers include Kip Koenig, Carolina Paiz, Eric Buchman, Joan Rater and Chris Van Dusen. Rob Corn returned to the series to direct 3 episodes for the season, after writing 2 episodes in the second season. Greg Yaitanes is credited for directing 2 episodes during the season, the only ones to have been directed by him in the series. Other prominent directors were Jeff Melman, Michael Grossman, Julie Anne Robinson and Adam Arkin, each directing 2 or more episodes during the season. Danny Lux continued his position as the main music composer for the series, while Herbert Davis and Walt Fraser served as the season's cinematography directors. Susan Vaill and Edward Ornelas resumed their positions as editors, seeing David Greenspan, Matthew Ramsey and Avi Fisher being added to the team. Fisher, however, left the series at the conclusion of the season.

Writing and filming 

The season was primarily filmed in Los Angeles, California. Fisher Plaza, which is the headquarters building for the media company Fisher Communications and Fisher's ABC-affiliated Komo radio and television stations for Seattle, is used for some exterior shots of Seattle Grace Mercy West Hospital, such as air ambulances landing on the Komo Television newscopter's helipad. This puts Seattle Grace conveniently close to the Space Needle, which is directly across the street from Fisher Plaza, the Seattle Monorail, and other local landmarks. However, the hospital used for most other exterior and many interior shots is not in Seattle, are shot at the VA Sepulveda Ambulatory Care Center in North Hills, California. Most scenes are primarily taped in Los Feliz, Los Angeles, at the Prospect Studios, and the set occupies 2 stages, including the hospital pieces, but some outside scenes are shot at the Warren G. Magnuson Park in Seattle. Several props used are genuine medical supplies, including the MRI machine. Before the production of the season officially began, producer Shonda Rhimes stated that she was planning a major development in Ellen Pompeo's character, Meredith Grey. 

"There's a spirit there that's just very interesting to me. She was charming and there was something about her so intriguing to watch", stated Rhimes in response to Pompeo's portrayal of her character. Executive producer Betsy Beers stated that the writing staff was going to focus on the balance between her vulnerability and her courage, also dealing with changes in the relationship with her friends. Pompeo noted that the uncertainty of her character's fate is what helped her evolve into a more adaptable actor. Rhimes also disclosed that an episode with Ellis Grey's unexpected lucidity and eventual death was in plans since the beginning of the series. Rhimes described how Pompeo got through the challenge of sending Meredith in the afterlife: "It was an exciting place to take her. Exciting to watch her find her way back." In response to Izzie's arc, Shonda Rhimes discussed the impact Denny Duquette's death will have on her, noting that Izzie is forced to abandon her idealism, which in turn leads to her letting go of medicine. In the aftermath of Denny's death, Katherine Heigl came to believe that Izzie was not cut out to be a doctor. Executive producer Betsy Beers explained, however, that Denny's death served to make Izzie more mature, and Heigl affirmed that "At the beginning of the third season, they were trying to show how lost Izzie was. She lost her optimism. She realizes now that life is difficult, but she still tries very hard to see the best in people."

Creator Shonda Rhimes compared what she deemed the 2 "most iconic moments of the season", describing how the season begins with Izzie lying in the prom dress on the bathroom, and ends with Cristina standing motionless in her wedding dress. Cast member Eric Dane described the impact his first scene in the season had on him, stating that it was a spectacular entrance: "It was a brand new towel, which had a hard time staying together. So every time I put it together and let my hands go, it was almost like throwing caution to the wind." Cast member Sara Ramirez noted that one of the most significant scene in the season was when Izzie and George "have this beautiful moment when neither of them speaks, but they say so much and it was just so rich", describing how their interaction during the scene determined everything that would be developed for their arc later. Betsy Beers, however, noted that the most "powerful" scene in the season saw Preston Burke and Cristina Yang in the on-call room, talking about the future of their relationship: "It's fascinating to see how their entire relationship changes and almost disintegrates in this one exchange." Beers and Rhimes expressed their desire to introduce Patrick Dempsey's passion of car racing in the series, although this ultimately did not occur during the season. "Patrick loved it. He's always driving something new, always trying something out", stated the series creator, regarding Dempsey's response to the storyline.  

Rhimes also described the difficulty she faced in finding an appropriate love-interest for the character of Alex Karev: "We kept meeting with people and it wasn't until we met Elizabeth Reaser and sat down with her, and 2 seconds into it we realized that she was absolutely the one we'd been looking for." Reaser explained that when she was cast, there were no definite plans for the development of her character, and that only the intrigue of the ferry accident had been explained to her. She also deemed her character "frustrated and scared." As for the make-up process, Reaser stated: "The prosthetic changes your outlook on yourself. It can be very disorienting. It's intense." Beers, however, noted that the focus on Ava was mainly due to her inability to express her feelings through facial expressions, only communicating with her eyes and voice. Executive producer Rob Corn stated that his plan for the original arc was about Jane Doe's inner life, struggling to get out of the situation she is trapped in. He stated that the main characteristics they had been looking for in the actress for the part were strength and vulnerability. He also called Reaser's performance "heart-wrenching and wonderful." Betsy Beers, the show's supervising executive producer, found Izzie to have been marked for life by Denny's death, which matured her "in a very sobering way", but played a major role in making her feel more confident. She also noted the undeniable connection between Izzie and Alex Karev, whose desire to do honorable things has been compared with his "cutting and sarcastic" personality. After Izzie's continuous efforts to change Alex during their relationship in the previous season, Beers announced the possibility of a relationship between the two of them. She also contrasted the female leads on the show with women in film, explaining how the characters on television are shaped in unique ways.

Casting 

The third season had 12 roles receiving star-billing, with 10 returning from the previous season, of whom 9 were part of the original cast. All the main characters are physicians in the surgical wing of the fictional Seattle Grace Hospital. Ellen Pompeo portrayed Meredith Grey, both the protagonist and the narrator of the series, whose main goal is achieving a balance between the difficulties of the internship, and the complicated relationships in her private life. Sandra Oh portrayed Cristina Yang, who quickly develops as Meredith's best-friend, despite the continuous competition against the other interns. Katherine Heigl portrayed intern Isobel "Izzie" Stevens, mourning the death of her fiancé as she unexpectedly decides to quit her job; she concludes that she is too personally involved with her patients. Justin Chambers acted as Alexander "Alex" Karev, whose abrasive, arrogant attitude is softened with a more emotional and sensitive outlook on his career and relationships. T. R. Knight played the role of intern George O'Malley, who gradually becomes more self-confident after his feelings for Meredith diminish. Chandra Wilson portrayed fifth-year resident in general surgery, Miranda Bailey, the resident in charge of the 5 interns. 

James Pickens, Jr. acted as Seattle Grace Hospital's Chief of Surgery, Richard Webber, who has to deal with the choice between his career and his marriage. Kate Walsh played Addison Montgomery, obstetrician-gynecologist and neonatal surgeon, who comes to terms with her husband Derek Shepherd's desire to divorce, while dealing with the arrival of her former lover. Isaiah Washington played the role of attending physician and cardiothoracic surgeon, Preston Burke, who becomes engaged to intern Cristina Yang after their developing a relationship. Patrick Dempsey portrayed attending neurosurgeon Derek Shepherd, whose relationship with intern Meredith Grey has been the focal-point of the series since its inception. Sara Ramirez began receiving star-billing in the season premiere, after numerous appearances during the last episodes of the second season. She portrayed orthopedic surgeon and fifth-year resident, Calliope "Callie" Torres, whose relationship with intern George O'Malley evolves into a sudden marriage with unpleasant repercussions. Eric Dane was also promoted to the series regular status after a guest appearance in the eighteenth episode of the previous season, and an uncredited one in the second episode of this season. He began receiving star-billing in the third episode of the season, portraying attending physician, otolaryngologist and plastic surgeon Mark Sloan, whose arc, describing the attempt at resuming his relationship with Addison Montgomery, is heavily developed throughout the season.

Numerous supporting characters have been given expansive and recurring appearances in the progressive storyline. Brooke Smith continues her role as cardiothoracic surgeon Erica Hahn, whose storylines include the rivalry with Preston Burke, her arrival to perform surgery of George O'Malley's dying father, and Richard Webber's decision to hire her in the hospital. Chyler Leigh portrayed Meredith's half-sister, Lexie Grey, who is accepted into the hospital's internship program after her mother's sudden death. Kate Burton appeared as Meredith Grey's mother, Ellis Grey, a renowned surgeon suffering from Alzheimer's disease, who ultimately dies following a heart attack. Veterinary physician Finn Dandrige was portrayed by Chris O'Donnell and appeared in the first 4 episodes of the season to resume the storyline of his romantic relationship with Meredith, previously introduced in the second season. Deceased since the second-season finale, character Dennsion "Denny" Duquette, Jr. (Jeffrey Dean Morgan) appeared in 2 episodes of the season, during Meredith's limbo sequence. 

Elizabeth Reaser portrayed Rebecca "Ava" Pope, recurring character and love-interest for Alex Karev. She arrives as a patient suffering from amnesia and severe facial injuries after being involved in a massive ferry crash. Loretta Devine acted as Adele Webber, Richard's wife, whose continuous struggle to have a normal marriage culminates in her asking her husband to retire. Other guest-stars include Sarah Utterback in the role of nurse Olivia Harper, former love-interest of both George O'Malley and Alex Karev, Kali Rocha portraying fifth-year resident Sydney Heron, who enters a competition against Miranda Bailey and Callie Torres for the position of Chief Resident, Roger Rees in the role of Colin Marlowe, a cardiothoracic surgeon and Cristina Yang's former professor and lover, Jeff Perry portraying Meredith Grey's father, Thatcher Grey; Mare Winningham in the role of Susan Grey, Embeth Davidtz playing Derek Shepherd's sister Nancy Shepherd, a surgeon who is revealed to have slept with Mark Sloan; Tsai Chin in the role of Helen Yang Rubenstein, Cristina's mother, and Diahann Carroll portraying Jane Burke, Preston Burke's overly protective mother. Future Private Practice series regulars Amy Brenneman, Paul Adelstein, Tim Daly, Taye Diggs, Chris Lowell starred in the twenty-second and twenty-third episodes of the season, portraying Violet Turner, Cooper Freedman, Peter Wilder, Sam Bennett and William "Dell" Parker, respectively, in order to make the transition to the proposed spin-off.

Spin-Off Launch 

On February 21, 2007, The Wall Street Journal reported that ABC was pursuing a spin-off medical drama television series for the series featuring Kate Walsh's character, Addison Montgomery. Subsequent reports confirmed the decision, stating that an expanded 2-hour broadcast of Grey's Anatomy would serve as a backdoor pilot for the proposed spin-off. The cast was reportedly unhappy about the decision, as all hoped the spin-off would have been given to them. Pompeo commented that she felt, as the star, she should have been consulted, and Heigl, disclosed that she had hoped for a spin-off for Izzie. The backdoor pilot that aired on May 3, 2007, sees Addison take "a leave-of-absence" from Seattle Grace Hospital, to visit her best-friend from Los Angeles, Naomi Bennett, a reproductive endocrinology and infertility specialist, in order to get pregnant. While in Los Angeles, she meets Bennett's colleagues at the Oceanside Wellness Center and even becomes the clinic's obstetrician-gynecologist for the day. The 2-hour broadcast served as the twenty-second and the twenty-third episodes of the third season, and was directed by Michael Grossman, according to Variety. The cast included Amy Brenneman, Paul Adelstein, Tim Daly, Taye Diggs, Chris Lowell and Merrin Dungey. ABC officially picked up Private Practice for its 2007 lineup on May 11, 2007. KaDee Strickland's character, Charlotte King, who would be introduced in the spin-off's first-season premiere, did not appear in the backdoor pilot. Her addition to the main cast was announced on July 11, 2007, prior to the commencement of the first season. She did not have to audition for the role, but was cast after a meeting with Rhimes. Also not present in the backdoor pilot was Audra McDonald, due to her character, Bennett, being portrayed by a different actress, Merrin Dungey. However, on June 29, 2007, ABC announced that Dungey would be replaced, with no reason given for the change. The premiere episode followed the second part of the season debut of Dancing with the Stars, and provided a lead-in to fellow freshman series, Dirty Sexy Money. Pushing Daisies, a third new series for the evening, rounded out the lineup as a lead-in to Private Practice. The series aired a total of 6 seasons, ending in 2013.

Reception

Ratings 
The second season of Grey's Anatomy ended with an average of 19.44 million viewers per episode and a 6.9 rating share for in the 18–49 demographic, determining the series to finish in #5 out of all the 100 television shows in the season. Due to its high ratings, the series received a full third season renewal for the fall primetime line-up. In response to numerous fan complaints regarding scheduling during the previous seasons, the American Broadcasting Company decided to do major changes in the season. After 2 seasons of airing as a lead-out to fellow ABC series Desperate Housewives, the network decided to move Grey's Anatomy to 9:00 ET in the Thursday night time-slot, dominated by CSI: Crime Scene Investigation, where the series began airing as a lead-out to Ugly Betty, which aired in the time-slot from its first season, until the conclusion of the third in 2009. The show maintained its position as a top 10 series and became the #8 most-watched program in the season, with an average of 19.220 million viewers per episode. The highest-rated episode of the season was the seventeenth, the highly anticipated conclusion of a 3-part story-arc, which was watched by 27.390, receiving a 9.7 rating, a #4 ranking in the week and a #1 ranking in the time-slot. The episode outperformed CSI's "Fallen Idols", which ranked #7 with a 7.7 rating and 21.780 million viewers tuning in. 

The lowest-rated episode was its ninth, which was watched by 18.510 million viewers, ranking third in the week with a 6.5 rating, outperforming CSI Thanksgiving special episode, "Living Legend", watched by 17.170 million viewers with a 6.1 rating and #4 ranking. The season premiere was watched by 25.41 million viewers and received 9.0 rating after being ranked #1 in both the time-slot and the week. The number of viewers increased significantly compared to the previous season premiere, which was watched by 18.980 million viewers and received a 6.8 rating. "Time Has Come Today" also outperformed the previous season finale, which was watched by 22.50 million viewers and was rated 8.0. The season finale was watched by 22.570 million viewers and received an 8.0 rating, ranking #3 in the week after American Idol. Wayne Firedman of Media Daily News described the move from the Sunday night time-slot to Thursdays as "the network's boldest and biggest move." He also expressed concerns regarding the tough competition the series will face, due to airing against CBS Network's CSI. Stephen McPherson of ABC Entertainment explained the reason for the change: "To have all hits on Sunday night doesn't help us. We wanted to be aggressive."

Critical response 

The season received mixed-to-negative reviews, after 2 seasons that resulted in high critical acclaim. Following a positive outlook on the second season, Christopher Monfette of IGN Entertainment expressed disappointment during the third one, mainly due to the declining quality and lack of realism of the storylines. He noted a growing number of similarities between the season's arcs and the ones that are developed in soap operas, by stating that "the line which separates primetime television from soap opera is oftentimes razor-thin" and admitting that, despite his considering the series "the best drama", he freely admits that it requires some inherent suspension of disbelief, after it "found itself mired in the annoying and absurd." Whereas Monfette acknowledged that the fans would consider the problem to have been a simple case of lazy writing, he noted that over-writing played a main role in the series becoming unexpectedly unrealistic. He also noted the senseless intrigues in the Meredith/Derek relationship, by stating that the season would not have achieved high ratings if a functional relationship had been introduced: "The season generally opts to stall out for its vast majority, providing Meredith with some bizarrely underdeveloped subplot about depression and giving Derek a season's worth of reconsidering to do." 

Monfette criticized the romantic development of the characters throughout the season, by describing Burke and Cristina's relationship as an excuse for the possibility of a wedding for Meredith, whereas Burke's unfair behavior towards Cristina is thought to be manipulative, exposing her to his overly-romantic notion of an ideal ceremony. The way the doubts regarding the success of their relationship were resolved in the season finale was described as "most-obvious and least-compelling." IGN Entertainment was also critical of Alex Karev's storyline, who is seen falling for a pregnant and badly injured Jane Doe, despite having always been "self-obsessed." Monfette once again noted the lack of realism in the improvement of Jane Doe's condition, as she gives birth to her baby and undergoes reconstructive surgery in a short amount of time. However, her incapability and continuous struggle to remember who she is was considered to be "the most affecting and honest plotline of the season", noting the nuanced and emotionally resonant scenes, which gave the show a "charmingly positive, feel-good foundation." Monfette considered Izzie's affair with George as the season's worst but most significant storyline, criticizing it as being "force-fed, emotionally-incorrect, a mismatch from the beginning and a narrative long-shot", which does not express love, but lust. He agreed that the essential problem of the season was its reluctance to move, leading to frustration after seeing "the entertaining familiar characters so weighed down by their most annoying of traits."

In response to the season premiere, Oscar Dahl of Buddytv.com noted the predictability of the series, but expressed hope in its further development, by stating that it has become "a medical chick flick, but a damn good one" with a big and attractive cast. He also praised the interaction between the characters, noting the "smart" dialogue that helps each character evolve. However, Dahl expressed disappointment in the over-emotional scenes, describing them as "off-putting" and "not believable", while comparing them to real-life interactions between people who emote in a more subtle manner than displayed on television. "Emotions ran high in the premiere and there was much crying", stated Dahl, but noted that the dialogue, who he had previously been worried would be "too cutesy", was not bothering, and rather realistic, noting how the show is "smartly written." He also described the acting of Ellen Pompeo and Katherine Heigl as "worthy of attention." 

New York Post Robert Rorke reviewed the numerous characters with heavy romantic development, noting perpetual "merry-go-round of hookups, breakups and makeup sex", while describing the lack of sentimental involvement of Katherine Heigl's character in the first half of the season. However, he deemed Izzie Stevens "the heart-and-soul" of the "sex-filled series", due to the season mostly focusing on the events that come to define her as a person. Rorke named her the show's heroine, and wrote that "Izzie is a welcome, calming presence, despite the devastation she experienced when she failed to save her patient and fiancé Denny Duquette", considering her to have been more prominent than the title character, Meredith Grey, whose storyline received negative critiques: "She used to be the queen of the romantic dilemmas. But lately, she's been a little dopey, with that endless McDreamy soliloquies." He also noted Meredith's decreasing importance in the ongoing arc, describing how Sandra Oh's character development was vital to the success of the season, as he compared her "cutthroat exterior" with the emotional side of her personality that evolves throughout the season. New York Post compared Izzie, who is described as having achieved a depth, to Miranda Bailey, noting the maturity they have, which is uncharacteristic to the fellow interns. Robert Rorke positively reviewed Chandra Wilson's performance by stating that she was "formidable."

Prior to the 59th Primetime Emmy Awards, Stuart Levine of Variety reviewed the performances of the 3 cast members nominated in the Outstanding Supporting Actress category. "The ladies of Grey's Anatomy dominate the category, and it'd be far from a stretch to say at least 2 of those women rose to high dramatics last season", commented Levine, while praising Sandra Oh for her portrayal of Cristina Yang who endured a tumultuous seasoning relationship, seeing her trepidation at spending a life together with the man she loved. He regarded the appearances of Chandra Wilson as more subdued, though "by no means less well-executed." He deemed Miranda Bailey a rock, being the most level-headed character on the show with a right thing to say in any situation. He expressed admiration towards Chandra Wilson, by describing her as being "flashy and over the top", which he considers better than being consistently good. Considering Heigl's chances of winning the Emmy, Levine assessed of her performance, by remarking the slight difficulty she has in reaching each emotional state Izzie Stevens has to go through: "Showrunner Shonda Rhimes puts a lot of pressure on Heigl to carry many intense storylines, and she's up to the challenge." However, he also noted that Izzie's irrational actions during crisis situations may be bothering.

Accolades 

The season was one of the most acclaimed of the show, receiving numerous awards and nominations. Several cast and crew members were nominated for their work on the show during its third season at the 59th Primetime Emmy Awards. Chandra Wilson received a nomination for Outstanding Supporting Actress in a Drama Series for her performance in "Oh, the Guilt", the season's fifth episode, whereas Sandra Oh was nominated for the same category for her portrayal of Cristina Yang in "From a Whisper to a Scream", the season's ninth episode. However, they both lost to co-star Katherine Heigl, whose portrayal of Izzie Stevens in "Time After Time", the twentieth episode of the season, resulted in her first Emmy win. 

T. R. Knight was also nominated for his performance in the third season in the Outstanding Supporting Actor in a Drama Series category, for the 2-episode arc "Six Days", the eleventh and second episodes of the season. Elizabeth Reaser and Kate Burton were nominated for Outstanding Guest Actress in a Drama Series, for their performances as Rebecca Pope in "My Favorite Mistake", the nineteenth episode in the season, and Ellis Grey in "Wishin' and Hopin'", the fourteenth episode. Linda Lowy and John Brace were nominated for Outstanding Casting in a Drama Series, while Norman T. Leavitt, Brigitte Bugayong, Thomas R. Burman and Bari Dreiband-Burman were nominated for Best Prosthetic Make-Up. The production team was acclaimed for the Best Drama Series category, but only received a nomination.

Sara Ramirez was nominated at the 2007 Alma Awards for her portrayal of Callie Torres. At the 65th Golden Globe Awards, the series was nominated for Best Television Drama Series, while Katherine Heigl's individual performance resulted in a nomination for Best Performance by an Actress in a Supporting Role in a Series, Mini-Series or Motion Picture Made for Television. The show's third season was once again recognized at the 38th National Association for the Advancement of Colored People Awards, when the production team was nominated for Best Drama Series. Also at the 2007 ceremony, Isaiah Washington won Outstanding Actor in a Drama Series for his portrayal of Preston Burke in this season, while Chandra Wilson won Outstanding Supporting Actress in a Drama Series. 

Several cast members have been awarded at the PRISM Awards in 2007: Katherine Heigl in the Favorite Female TV Star category for portraying Izzie Stevens, Patrick Dempsey  for Favorite Male TV Star in the role of Derek Shepherd, and Chandra Wilson in the Favorite Scene Stealing Star category for her performance of Miranda Bailey. Mark Gordon, Shonda Rhimes, James D. Parriott, Betsy Beers, Peter Horton and Rob Corn have been nominated at the Producers Guild of America 2007 Awards for Television Producer of the Year Award in Episodic Drama for the production of the third season, after winning the award at the 2006 Awards for the second season. At the 2007 Satellite Awards, Ellen Pompeo won the award Best Actress in Drama Series, while T. R. Knight was nominated for Best Supporting Actor in a Series, Miniseries or TV Film and Chandra Wilson for Best Supporting Actress in a Series, Miniseries or TV Film. At the 14th Screen Actors Guild Awards, the series' regular cast received a nomination for Outstanding Cast in Drama Series. Katherine Heigl and Patrick Dempsey were nominated at the 2007 Teen Choice Awards. Also in 2007, the female cast and crew of Grey's Anatomy received the Women in Film Lucy Award, which honors those whose work in television has positively influenced attitudes toward women.

DVD release 

The third season was officially released on DVD in region 1 on September 11, 2007, becoming available in both the United States and Canada. It was released 2 weeks before the fourth season originally began airing. The title of the box set, "Grey's Anatomy: Season Three – Seriously Extended" is a pun, referring to the success the series had, using the medical term "extension." Also in the official title is the world "seriously", which is one frequently-used in the series. The box-set consists of episodes with Dolby Digital 5.1 surround sound and widescreen format, enhanced for television with a 16:9 aspect ratio. It was distributed by Buena Vista Home Entertainment. The same set was released in region 4 on October 31, 2007, being made available first in Australia. In region 2, the season was first released in Romania on August 12, 2008, shortly after the season concluded airing on national television. In the United Kingdom, the season was released on September 15, 2008, approximately a year after its original release in the United States. Although the season aired in high definition, it has not been released on Blu-ray in any region to date.

The box-set includes all the original 25 episodes that aired on the American Broadcasting Company, being divided into 7 discs. Subtitles are available in French, in Spanish and in English for the hearing impaired, whereas the available languages for the character voices are English, French and Spanish. It featured audio commentaries with cast members Kate Walsh, Chandra Wilson, Ellen Pompeo, Kate Burton and Sandra Oh for the first, fourteenth and twenty-first episodes. It also featured the first, seventh, thirteenth and fourteenth episodes as extended episodes, with a longer running time. The bonus features were available on the seventh disc, including interviews with cast members Patrick Dempsey, Ellen Pompeo and Elizabeth Reaser, listed under the titles of "Making Rounds With Patrick Dempsey", "One on One with Ellen Pompeo" and "Prescription for Success: Making Jane Doe a Star", respectively. The region 1 release featured footage from behind the scenes, under the title of "In Stitches: Season 3 Outtakes" and unaired scenes from 9 episodes, including the season premiere and the finale, under the name of "Dissecting Grey's Anatomy." Omnipresent in the bonus material were executive producers Shonda Rhimes and Betsy Beers, providing their outlook on characters, actors and the production process.

The box-set received mixed reviews. Kelly West of CinemaBlend noted that the "seriously extended episodes" were not significantly expanded, only adding a few minutes of extra footage, which don't influence the storyline. She also noted a "weakness" in the audio commentary provided by 4 of the actresses, who she deemed to have been fantastic during the series, describing the features as "random chit-chats." However, she praised Sandra Oh's commentary, noting that she put the most effort in hers by trying to come up with interest topics, while being "amusing and worth listening to." She described the bonus features as "mildly entertaining", emphasizing Dempsey's interview about his passion for racing cars, which she regarded useless. USA Today had a positive perspective on the box-set, by calling it "scintillating" and "addictive."

References

External links 

 
 
 

2006 American television seasons
2007 American television seasons

Grey's Anatomy seasons